Anatoma boucheti is a species of minute sea snail, a marine gastropod mollusc or micromollusc in the family Anatomidae.

Description

Distribution

References

 Geiger D.L. & Sasaki T. (2008) Four new species of Anatomidae (Mollusca: Vetigastropoda) from the Indian Ocean (Reunion, Mayotte) and Australia, with notes on a novel radular type for the family. Zoosymposia 1: 247–164.
 Geiger D.L. (2012) Monograph of the little slit shells. Volume 1. Introduction, Scissurellidae. pp. 1–728. Volume 2. Anatomidae, Larocheidae, Depressizonidae, Sutilizonidae, Temnocinclidae. pp. 729–1291. Santa Barbara Museum of Natural History Monographs Number 7.

External links

Anatomidae
Gastropods described in 2008